Anak Agung Gede Ngurah Puspayoga (born July 7, 1965) is an Indonesian politician. He was Indonesia's Minister of Cooperatives and Small & Medium Enterprises under President Joko Widodo's Working Cabinet between 2014 and 2019. Previously, he served as the Vice Governor of Bali from 2008 to 2013 and Mayor of Denpasar, Bali's capital city, from 2000 to 2008.

Early life and education 
Puspayoga was born on July 7, 1965 in Denpasar, Bali. His father, Cok Sayoga, was a prominent PDI-P party figure in Bali, having a close relationship with the party's chairman, Megawati Sukarnoputri, since the 1980s. He obtained his bachelor's degree from Ngurah Rai University in 1991.

Career 
Puspayoga hold his first political office as the member of Bali's local parliament from PDI-P in 1999. He became the mayor of Denpasar the following year, a position which he would hold for eight years. In 2008, he won the Bali gubernatorial election, running along with I Made Mangku Pastika. He then served with Pastika as his deputy until 2013.

He ran for Bali's governor office in 2013, choosing Dewa Nyoman Sukriawan as his running mate. He subsequently lost the election to the incumbent governor and former superior, Pastika.

On October 26, 2014, the newly elected Indonesian President Joko Widodo named him as Minister of Cooperatives and Small & Medium Enterprises.

References 

Balinese people
Indonesian Hindus
Mayors and regents of places in Bali
Living people
1965 births
Government ministers of Indonesia
People from Denpasar
Politicians from Bali
Working Cabinet (Joko Widodo)
Mayors of places in Indonesia